Invader Zim: Enter the Florpus (titled onscreen as Dib Membrane VS. Invader Zim: Enter the Florpus) is a 2019 American animated science fiction comedy film written by Jhonen Vasquez. It is based on and is a continuation of the animated television series Invader Zim, which was created by Vasquez and originally aired on Nickelodeon from 2001 to 2002 and later Nicktoons in 2006. Originally created as a television film for Nickelodeon's own network, Netflix bought its distribution rights in May 2019. The film was released on Netflix on August 16, 2019, and received critical acclaim, with critics praising the animation, humor, and voice performances.

Plot

When alien Irken infiltrator Zim suddenly reappears after a long absence, his now-overweight human nemesis Dib Membrane confronts him. Zim reveals that his disappearance was meant to make Dib too physically unfit to oppose him, allowing Zim to begin Phase Two of his plan. Zim contacts his leaders, the Almighty Tallest Red and Purple, but realizes during the call he has forgotten what Phase Two entails.

Dib regains his physical fitness with help from his sister Gaz. Their father Professor Membrane gives Dib a prototype device called the Membracelet, meant to harness the positive energy of the world's children, but expresses his disappointment in Dib's continued belief in aliens. An incensed Dib goes to confront Zim but finds him in a state of depression; Zim and his robotic assistant GIR have been unable to remember Phase Two and, furthermore, have realized that the Irken Armada does not plan to invade Earth. Defeated, Zim surrenders to Dib, who decides to present him to the world during his father's Membracelet presentation.

At Professor Membrane's keynote address, Dib allows Zim to modify the prototype Membracelet to hijack the presentation. However, as soon as Zim is free, the lights go out, Membrane disappears, and Zim takes control of the stage in disguise. Dib awakens the next day to find that he and Gaz are imprisoned in their own home by Clembrane, a failed clone of their father, while Zim continues distributing the modified Membracelets around the world. After GIR compels every child on Earth to hold hands while wearing the bracelets, Zim uses Minimoose and the combined energy of the Membracelets to teleport Earth into the Irken Armada's flight path to force the Tallest to visit him. However, the irritated Tallest decide to simply destroy him along with the Earth once they reach it.

The Earth's sudden teleportation suddenly opens a "Florpus", a space-time rift capable of consuming the planet and merging it with alternate realities, but Zim ignores the danger and begins preparing for the Tallest' arrival. Dib and Gaz escape using a spaceship formerly belonging to Zim's Irken rival Tak and free Professor Membrane from intergalactic space prison Moo-Ping 10; Dib expresses his desire for his father to be proud of him, and Membrane tells Dib that he is already proud of him, despite his belief in the supernatural. Dib lands on Earth and fights Zim for control of Minimoose to stop the Florpus, while Membrane, revealed to have robotic prosthetics, helps Dib destroy Zim's robot army. Although the Membranes are able to recover Minimoose after turning Clembrane on Zim, the Irken Armada finally arrives to destroy Earth just as it enters the Florpus. As Earth begins colliding with alternate realities, Membrane finally figures out how to teleport the planet back to its original location, while the Armada flies directly into the Florpus.

Back on Earth, the Membrane family is reunited, and Zim appears at their window claiming the real goal of Phase Two was stealing a ceramic clown figurine from their living room. Zim contacts the Tallest to report his success, only to see them suffering in an alternate reality. Zim interprets their anguished screams as them being pleased with his work before he is crushed by a falling pug that GIR had launched into space at the beginning of the movie; GIR launches the pug into space again.

Voice cast
 Richard Steven Horvitz as Zim
 Rosearik Rikki Simons as GIR and Bloaty
 Andy Berman as Dib
 Melissa Fahn as Gaz
 Rodger Bumpass as Professor Membrane
 Wally Wingert and Kevin McDonald as The Almighty Tallest
 Jhonen Vasquez as Clembrane, Zim's Computer, Minimoose, Schmoopsy and Bees
 Olivia d'Abo as Tak's ship
 Paul Greenberg as Weird Alien #2 and Poonchy
 Justin Roiland as Foodio 3000, Weird Alien #1 and Excited Audience Member
 Eric Bauza as Bracelet Monster, Announcer, Angry Man and Boy
 Fred Tatasciore as Peace Day Host, Comms Officer, Ham V.O., Alien Guard and Man
 Mo Collins as Robo-Mom
 Michael McDonald as Robo-Dad
 Breehn Burns as Neighbor and Hot Dog Guy
 Jenny Goldberg as Floopsy, Martha, Happy Lady, Weird Alien #3, Girl and Gloinky

Announcement
On November 8, 2016, Harvey Beaks and Chowder creator C. H. Greenblatt was asked by a fan on Tumblr if he would work with Jhonen Vasquez on a hypothetical Invader Zim movie, and Greenblatt responded, "Jhonen IS making an Invader Zim movie for Nick. I'm not a part of it, but I'm excited." However, Jhonen initially denied this on his Twitter, most likely because he was under contract to not say anything at the time and was forced to dismiss it as a "rumor".

On April 4, 2017, over sixteen years since the series' debut and eleven years since the last "unaired" episode premiered in the United States, Nickelodeon officially announced that they had green-lit a 71-minute television film based on the series.

At San Diego Comic-Con 2018, Jhonen explained that Nickelodeon had been asking him about doing more Invader Zim for years and that he always had to decline their offers either because he was busy working on something else or due to not being able to come to an agreement with Nickelodeon on a budget for a Invader Zim revival; but being "completely miserable" with the other things he was working on at the time, Jhonen accepted Nickelodeon's latest offer to do more Invader Zim. Nickelodeon initially wanted a new Invader Zim television series, but Jhonen suggested a six-episode miniseries instead. He soon changed his mind to a television film, since doing a film would be "infinitely less stressful".

Promotion
Three teaser trailers for the film were released in the next four days following the initial announcement.

Invader Zim: Enter the Florpus had a panel at San Diego Comic-Con on July 20, 2018; during the panel, some never-before-seen production art such as backgrounds and turn-around charts for the film were revealed. A trailer put together out of unedited first take animation for the film was also shown at the panel accompanied by some original music composed for the trailer by Kevin Manthei. During the panel, Jhonen explained that he put the trailer together out of some random animated footage he had for the film that he thought looked presentable enough to show people and that most of the shots used in the trailer were going to be sent back overseas to be re-animated.

Production
Invader Zim: Enter the Florpus is produced by Nickelodeon Animation Studio in collaboration with animation services by Maven Animation Studio in South Korea. During the Invader Zim: Enter the Florpus panel at San Diego Comic-Con on July 20, 2018, Jhonen revealed that they had written the film in 2015 and that at the time of the panel, they were in the process of getting first take animation back from their overseas animation team, Maven Animation Studio.

Jhonen Vasquez returned as executive producer and as the voice of Zim's computer, along with Kevin Manthei as the composer, and Jenny Goldberg, who worked on the Invader Zim comic book series, is the art director for the film. Breehn Burns, the supervising producer for the film, confirmed that production on Enter the Florpus officially wrapped on January 17, 2019.

Release
Invader Zim: Enter the Florpus was originally created as a television film for Nickelodeon's own network, but on May 10, 2019, Viacom president Robert Bakish revealed in a conference call that Netflix had acquired the distribution rights to the film. On July 23, 2019, Netflix released a clip of the special with the release date shown. The movie was announced to be released on August 16, 2019.

On February 1, 2019, Nickelodeon held a cast-and-crew-exclusive screening of Enter the Florpus. On July 24, 2019, the Nickelodeon Animation Studio held an exclusive pre-screening of Invader Zim: Enter the Florpus which was only accessible for ASIFA-Hollywood members. The Frida Cinema in Santa Ana, California held a free theatrical screening of Invader Zim: Enter the Florpus on August 16, 2019, to celebrate the premiere of the film. Series creator Jhonen Vasquez, art director Jenny Goldberg, and voice actors Rikki Simons and Melissa Fahn attended the screening for an exclusive Q&A.

Reception
Invader Zim: Enter the Florpus has received critical acclaim. The site's critical consensus reads: "Invader Zim quits being banished all over again in Enter the Florpus, an excellent revival that captures the spirit of the cartoon while cranking the doom up to eleven."

Charles Pulliam-Moore of io9 wrote that the film "[conveys] how much more potential there still is in the Invader Zim franchise", and noted that "By turning Zim into a legitimate threat ... Enter the Florpus both gives Dib a real reason to fight and makes you question which of them you'd want to win in the end". NPR's Vincent Acovino said "Invader Zim: Enter the Florpus serves as an excellent reminder of why the series holds such a special place in the Nicktoon canon. It's weird, smart and bracingly unsentimental." Palmer Haasch of Polygon lauded the portrayal of the relationship between Dib and Professor Membrane, calling it "The best thing" about the film.

Joe Matar of Den of Geek praised the film's "inventive moments and truly hilarious laugh-out-loud jokes", and wrote that "The art and animation look almost perfect", though he called the film's aesthetic "a little too bright and sterile". Matthew Dougherty of IGN favorably compared Enter the Florpus to what Serenity did with Firefly, while also saying "The sci-fi elements are fun, the humor is wildly absurd, and the animation is breathtaking. In this case, that's enough for this return to be worth the wait." Siobhan Ball of The Daily Dot gave the film three out of five stars, writing that "With Enter the Florpus, Invader Zim has matured without losing any of the elements that endeared it to subculture teens in the first place." Eric Vilas-Boas of Thrillist wrote that "the dazzlingly animated space battles, and the firehose stream of gross and morbid humor that make Invader Zim: Enter the Florpus well worth the long, 17-year wait." Kellen Beck of Mashable said "The best thing about Invader Zim: Enter the Florpus is the way it manages to perfectly capture the spirit of the TV show and transport my brain right back to the early [2000s]." Sol Harris of Starburst gave the film a score of 7 out of 10, saying "Enter the Florpus is a fairly typical Nickelodeon TV-movie in that it retains everything that made the show work – its humor, its characters, its tone – but it suffers from messy pacing."

References

External links

 
 

2019 films
2010s American animated films
2010s science fiction comedy films
2010s children's comedy films
2019 animated films
Alien invasions in films
American robot films
Animated films based on animated series
Animated films about robots
Animated films about extraterrestrial life
Animated films about children
Invader Zim
Films directed by Jhonen Vasquez
Films scored by Kevin Manthei
English-language Netflix original films
Nickelodeon animated films
Nickelodeon original films
2019 comedy films
2010s English-language films